Pierre-Jules Cavelier (30 August 1814, Paris – 28 January 1894, Paris) was a French academic sculptor.

Biography
The son of a silversmith and furniture maker, Cavelier was born in Paris.  He was a student of the sculptors David d'Angers and the painter Paul Delaroche, Cavelier won the Prix de Rome in 1842 with a plaster statue of Diomedes Entering the Palladium.  The young sculptor lived at the Villa Medici from 1843–47.

Appointed in 1864 Professor at the École des beaux-arts, he trained many students there, including René Rozet, Édouard Lantéri, Hippolyte Lefèbvre, Louis-Ernest Barrias, Eugène Guillaume, Fernand Hamar, the British Alfred Gilbert and the American George Grey Barnard, as well as conducting his own prolific career as a sculptor.

Notable Works
 Two caryatids, sketch group, terracotta, Paris, Musée du Louvre, 1854
 Paris on the exterior of the Gare du Nord, Paris
 Cornélie, Mother of Gracchi group, marble, Paris, Orsay Museum, 1861
 Angel on the bell tower, Saint-Germain l'Auxerrois, Paris

Gallery

References

 Simone Hoog, Musée national de Versailles. Les sculptures. I. Le Musée, Réunion des musées nationaux, Paris, 1993
 Emmanuel Schwartz, Les Sculptures de l'École des Beaux-Arts de Paris. Histoire, doctrines, catalogue, École nationale supérieure des Beaux-Arts, Paris, 2003
 J. Le Fustec, "La statue de Montyon", Le Magasin pittoresque,  1894, p. 65-67

External links

1814 births
1894 deaths
French architectural sculptors
Prix de Rome for sculpture
Academic staff of the École des Beaux-Arts
Artists from Paris
Members of the Académie des beaux-arts
Burials at Père Lachaise Cemetery
19th-century French sculptors
French male sculptors
19th-century French male artists